Faisal Shboul is the Jordanian Minister of Government Communications. He was appointed as minister on 27 October 2022. Previously he had served as Minister of State for Media Affairs from 11 October 2021 until 27 October 2022.

Education 
Shboul holds a Bachelor of Journalism from the Lebanese University.

References 

Living people
21st-century Jordanian politicians
Government ministers of Jordan
Jordanian politicians
Lebanese University alumni
Year of birth missing (living people)